João Lopes (20 October 1919 – 24 June 2015) was a Portuguese equestrian. He competed at the 1952 Summer Olympics and the 1960 Summer Olympics.

References

External links
 

1919 births
2015 deaths
Portuguese male equestrians
Olympic equestrians of Portugal
Equestrians at the 1952 Summer Olympics
Equestrians at the 1960 Summer Olympics
Sportspeople from Maputo